Presidential elections were held in the Republic of Abkhazia on 24 August 2014. The sixth such elections since the post of President of Abkhazia was created in 1994, they were held early due to the resignation of President Alexander Ankvab on 1 June 2014 following the 2014 Abkhazian political crisis. Four candidates contested the elections, which were won by Raul Khadjimba, who received just over 50% of the vote.

Background

On 27 May, opposition protesters stormed the Presidential administration, prompting Ankvab to flee to Gudauta. The resulting crisis culminated in his resignation on 1 June. As Vice President Mikhail Logua had already resigned in December 2013 due to ill health, Speaker of the People's Assembly of Abkhazia Valeri Bganba has become acting president.

On 3 June 2014, chairman of the Central Election Committee Batal Tabagua announced that the committee had begun preparations for the Presidential election and that the date had been set for 24 August.

Candidates
Candidates could be nominated between 25 June and 14 July. Parties registered less than five months before the election date were not be eligible to nominate candidates. On 14 July, the Central Election Commission announced that all candidates except Beslan Eshba had passed the Abkhaz language fluency test. On 15 July, the Central Election Commission officially registered Khajimba, Kishmaria, Bazhania and Dzapshba as candidates. Of these, the first three received their registration certificates that same day, and Dzapshba on 16 July.

Mirab Kishmaria
Kishmaria's campaign manager was former MP Ilia Gamisonia.

Kishmaria campaigned on 23 July in the villages of Sanarda, Agubedia and Pervaya Bedia (Tkvarcheli District), on 24 July in Lykhny and Duripsh (Gudauta District), on 25 July in Tsandrypsh and Makhadyr (Gagra District), on 29 July again in Lykhny, on 7 August among diaspora voters in Moscow, on 14 August with voters in Cherkessk, on 15 August in Primorskoe, Abgarkhuk and Achandara (Gudauta District), on 18 August in Sukhumi's New District and on 21 August in Tkvarcheli.

Leonid Dzapshba
Dzapshba's campaign manager was former chairman of the State Committee for Youth Affairs and Sports Rafael Ampar. His candidate for the post of prime minister was former Foreign Affairs Minister Maxim Gvinjia.

Dzapshba campaigned on 11 August in the villages of Babushara (Gulripshi District) and Kutol and Jgyarda (Ochamchire District),

Raul Khajimba
Khajimba's campaign manager was MP Artur Mikvabia. His candidate for the post of prime minister was Beslan Butba, who had been appointed acting Vice Premier following President Ankvab's resignation.

Khajimba campaigned on 19 July in Ochamchire and Shaumyanovka (Gulripshi District), on 22 July in the villages of Alakhadzy, Kolkhida and Bzypta (Gagra District), on 23 July in Uarcha and Pshap (Gulripshi District), on 30 July in Kutol (Ochamchire District), on 11 August in Chlou and Tkhina (Ochamchire District), on 12 August in Salme, Mekhadyr and Bagrypsh (Gagra District), on 14 August in Myrkul (Ochamchire District), on 21 August in Achandara and Duripsh (Gudauta District) and Lower Eshera (Sukhumi District) and on 22 August in Lykhny (Gudauta District).

Aslan Bzhania
On 16 July and for the duration of the election, Bzhania's tasks as head of the State Security Service were transferred to First Deputy Head Zurab Margania.

Bzhania's campaign manager was Leonid Lakerbaia, who resigned as prime minister along with Alexander Ankvab, and his deputy campaign managers Mikhail Logua, vice president under Ankvab until December 2013, and Agriculture Minister Beslan Jopua. Bzhania's candidate for the post of prime minister was State Customs Committee Head Said Tarkil.

Bzhania campaigned on 20 July in Tkvarcheli and the villages of Bedia and Agubedia (Tkvarcheli District), on 21 July in Agudzera and Markhiaul (Gulripshi District), on 23 July in Sukhumi's New District, on 24 July in the villages of Gumista and Iastkhua (Sukhumi District), on 28 July again in Sukhumi, on 29 July again in Gulripshi District, on 1 August among diaspora voters in Moscow, on 7 August in Ochamchire, on 14 August in Sukhumi's Sinop District, on 16 August in Gagra, on 17 August with Russian-speaking voters, on 19 August in Pitsunda, on 20 August in Gudauta, and on 21 August in Sukhumi's Kinoprokat District.

Campaign
On 24 July, a prayer service was held in Sukhumi Cathedral in which all four candidates participated. On 25 July all four candidates signed an election covenant promising to conduct fair election campaigns.

Participation of Georgian voters
One of the key complaints of the opposition during the 2014 Abkhazian political crisis was that thousands of Georgian residents of the Gali, Tkvarcheli and Ochamchira Districts had received Abkhazian passports in violation of citizenship law. Accordingly, on 1 July, 22787 Georgians were stricken from the voters list.

Re-opening of railway-connection with Armenia through Georgia
On 7 July, four Armenian former and current members of the People's Assembly launched an appeal that Abkhazia should actively push for the restoration of the Russian-Armenian railway link through Abkhazia, as it would strengthen both Abkhazia's economy and sovereignty. The proposal received sharp criticism in Parliament, in part due to the use in the appeal of the phrase 'the Abkhazian-Georgian section of the railway'. On 16 July, Aslan Bzhania expressed his support for the proposal.

Incidents
Around 4:05 in the morning of 20 August, a grenade was thrown into courtyard of CEC head Batal Tabagua. No one was injured, Tabagua's and neighbouring houses were damaged.

On 22 August, at about 18:00, the parked car of Nuzhnaya journalist Isida Chania was shot at from a white Lexus SUV. At the crime scene, 29 empty cartridges and 2 bullets were found.

Conduct
As in previous elections, there will be polling stations outside Abkhazia, in Moscow and Cherkessk. For the first time, there will also be a polling station in Istanbul. All three polling stations are assigned to District no. 5 in Sukhumi, where the Ministry for Foreign Affairs is located.

Opinion polls

Results
According to the official results released by the Central Election Commission on 26 August, Raul Khajimba was elected in the first round.

References

 
Abkhazia